The Public School Boards' Association of Alberta (PSBAA) is a not-for-profit society, the members of which can be any public school jurisdiction, or First Nations Education Authority, in Alberta, Canada. The membership criteria for the Association requires a school jurisdiction which provides public education to affirm its support to the Objects of the Association.

Jurisdictions
Twenty-six of forty-two public school jurisdictions in Alberta belong to the Association as of January, 2023. These jurisdictions are:
 
Aspen View Public Schools
Buffalo Trail Public Schools
Canadian Rockies Public Schools
Edmonton Public Schools
Fort McMurray Public School District
Golden Hills School Division
Grande Prairie Public School Division
Grande Yellowhead Public School Division
Grasslands Public Schools
High Prairie School Division
Lethbridge School Division
Medicine Hat Public School Division
Northern Gateway Public Schools
Northern Lights Public Schools
The Northland School Division
Parkland School Division
Peace Wapiti Public School Division
Pembina Hills School Division
Prairie Land Public School Division
Prairie Rose Public Schools
Wetaskiwin Regional Public Schools
Wild Rose School Division
Wolf Creek Public Schools

The main activities of the Association are: advocacy for public school education; leadership development programs for school trustees, system administrators, and citizen advocates for public school education; building and maintaining political relations with the provincial government and the provincial public service; and, research and the dissemination of findings significant to the improvement of public education.

The Association is host of the Public School Boards Council, a representative assembly for school jurisdictions in Alberta, at which assembly the jurisdictions speak about issues of concern to public school education, and do so without relying on the intermediary of a separate corporate entity.

History

The Public School Boards' Association of Alberta was founded in 1989, at a convention held in Edmonton, Alberta.

Presidents in order were:
Mr. Dick Mather, a trustee of the Edmonton Public School District (1989 - 1991) 
Mr. Gordon Pearcy of Grande Prairie Public School District (1991 - 1992)
Ms. Deb Poffenroth, of Foothills School Division (1992 - 1994)
Ms. Anita Dent, of Peace River School Division (1994 - 1996)
Mr. Dick Chamney, of Buffalo Trail School Division (1996 - 1997)
Mr. Clyde Blackburn, of Grande Prairie Public School District (1997 - 1999)
Mr. Don Fleming, of Edmonton Public School District (1999 - 2000)
Ms. Carolyn Kaiser, of Foothills School Division (2000 - 2001)
Ms. Joan Trettler, of St. Albert Protestant Separate School District (2001 - 2005)
Mr. Don Fleming, of Edmonton Public School District (2005 - 2009)
Ms. Patty Dittrick, of Clearview School Division (2009 - 2013)
Ms. Arlene Hrynyk, of Northern Lights Public Schools (2013 - 2017)
Ms. Cathy Hogg of Prairie Rose School Division (2017 - 2021)
Mr. Dennis MacNeil of Aspen View Public School (2021 - present)

Executive Directors in order were: 
Mr. David King (1990 - 2010)
Ms. Mary Lynne Campbell (2010 - 2018)
Mr. Brian Callaghan (2018 - 2020)
Mr. Troy Tait (2020 - present)

External links
The Public School Boards' Association of Alberta

Educational organizations based in Alberta